Joe Reindorf (1924 – 1996) was a Ghanaian historian, lawyer and politician. He served in the third republic as Attorney General and minister for Justice of Ghana.

Early life and education
Formerly a pupil of Achimota School, his contemporaries included K. B. Asante, Victor Owusu and R. R. Amponsah. He was a research student in history at Cambridge University in 1951, completing his studies in 1956 and finishing a law degree at the same time.

Career
He was called to the English bar in 1954. He returned to Ghana after his research studies in 1956 to enter into private legal practice. In 1962 he joined the University of Ghana as a research fellow in history. This stint ended in 1966 when he went back into private practice. He was president of the Ghana Bar Association in 1970–1971.

Politics
During the inception of the third republic in 1979, he was appointed Attorney General and minister for Justice in the Limann led government. He resigned after he was moved to the ministry of Local Government in a 1981 ministerial reshuffle. He was replaced by his deputy Archibald Lartey Djabatey.

Death
He died in 1996 at the age of 72.

See also
Attorney General of Ghana
Limann government

References

Date of birth unknown
Justice ministers of Ghana
Attorneys General of Ghana
20th-century Ghanaian lawyers
Academic staff of the University of Ghana
People's National Party (Ghana) politicians
Alumni of Achimota School
Alumni of the University of Cambridge
1924 births
1996 deaths